The 1922 Rochester Jeffersons season was their third in the league. The team failed to improve on their previous output of 2–3, going 0–4–1. They tied for fifteenth place in the league.

Schedule

Standings

References

Rochester Jeffersons seasons
Rochester Jeffersons
Rochester
National Football League winless seasons